The Huabiao Award for Outstanding Actress was first awarded in 1995.

Winners & nominations

2010s

2000s

1990s

References

External links
 第十四届中国电影华表奖新浪专题
 第十三届中国电影华表奖新浪专题
 第十二届中国电影华表奖新浪专题
 第十一届中国电影华表奖搜狐专题

Huabiao Awards
Awards established in 1995
1995 establishments in China
Film awards for lead actress